Abdul Salam Sabrah (1 January 1912 – 2 February 2012) was the acting Prime Minister of the Yemen Arab Republic three times. His first term was in 1969, from 9 July to 29 July. His second and third terms were both in 1971, from 26 February to 3 May and from 5 September to 18 September. All three terms were under President Abdul Rahman al-Iryani. He died on 2 February 2012 at the age of 100.

References

Prime Ministers of North Yemen
2012 deaths
1912 births
Yemeni centenarians
Men centenarians
20th century Yemeni judges
Free Officers Organization (Yemen)